COMSOL Multiphysics is a finite element analysis, solver, and simulation software package for various physics and engineering applications, especially coupled phenomena and multiphysics. The software facilitates conventional physics-based user interfaces and coupled systems of partial differential equations (PDEs). COMSOL provides an IDE and unified workflow for electrical, mechanical, fluid, acoustics, and chemical applications.

Beside the classical problems that can be addressed with application modules, the core Multiphysics package can be used to solve PDEs in weak form.
An API for Java and LiveLink for MATLAB and LiveLink products for major CAD software can be used to control the software externally.
An Application Builder can be used to develop independent custom domain-specific simulation apps. Users may use drag-and-drop tools (Form Editor) or programming (Method Editor). 
COMSOL Server is a distinct software for the management of COMSOL simulation applications in companies.
Several modules are available for COMSOL, categorized according to the applications areas of Electrical, Mechanical, Fluid, Acoustic, Chemical, Multipurpose, and Interfacing.

See also
Finite element method
Multiphysics
List of computer simulation software

References

External links
 

Finite element software
Finite element software for Linux
Computer-aided engineering software
Physics software